Aldon may refer to:

 Aldon, Shropshire, hamlet near Stokesay, England
 Aldon Inc., subsidiary of Rocket Software, an American software company
 Aldon Music, American music publishing company
 Mari Aldon (1925-2004), Canadian-born American actress
 Aldon Smith, American football player